Moldova competed at the 1998 Winter Olympics in Nagano, Japan.

Biathlon

Men

Women

 1 A penalty loop of 150 metres had to be skied per missed target.
 2 One minute added per missed target.

References
Official Olympic Reports
 Olympic Winter Games 1998, full results by sports-reference.com

Nations at the 1998 Winter Olympics
1998
Winter